David Lawrence Lipsey, Baron Lipsey (born 21 April 1948) is a British journalist and Labour Party politician.

After attending Bryanston School, Dorset (1962–67), Lipsey won an Exhibition in Politics, Philosophy and Economics (PPE) at Magdalen College, Oxford in 1968 and graduated with a First Class degree, winning the University Gibbs Prize in Politics in 1969. He went on to become a political adviser to Anthony Crosland in Opposition and an adviser to 10 Downing Street. He has worked as a journalist for a variety of different publications including the Sunday Times, Sunday Correspondent, The Times, The Guardian and The Economist. From 1982 to 1983 he was Chairman of the Fabian Society and from 1970 to 1972 Secretary of the Streatham Labour Party.

David Lipsey was awarded a Special Orwell Prize in 1997 for his work as ‘Bagehot’ in The Economist.

Lipsey has held numerous senior posts in public life. As well as his economic and social interests, he chairs the All Party Parliamentary group on Classical Music (from 2011), is a patron of the Glasbury Arts Festival, a trustee of the Cambrian Orchestra Trust and chairman of the Sidney Nolan Trust (from 2011), as well as being a trustee of other arts organisations. Lipsey was created a Life peer as Baron Lipsey, of Tooting Bec in the London Borough of Wandsworth, on 30 July 1999. He sits on the Labour benches in the House of Lords.

His sporting interests have included harness racing and presidency of the British Harness Racing Club (2008 to 2016) as well as chairmanship of the British Greyhound Racing Board (now the Greyhound Board of Great Britain) from 2004 to 2009.

References

Sources
 http://biographies.parliament.uk/parliament/default.asp?id=26939
 http://hansard.millbanksystems.com/people/mr-david-lipsey
 http://lordsoftheblog.wordpress.com/the-authors/
 https://www.telegraph.co.uk/news/uknews/1351595/Life-in-the-Lords-is-too-tough-says-Labour-peer.html
 Catalogue of the Lipsey papers held at LSE Archives

1948 births
Living people
People educated at Bryanston School
Alumni of Magdalen College, Oxford
Chairs of the Fabian Society
Labour Party (UK) life peers
British male journalists
People in greyhound racing
Life peers created by Elizabeth II